Vera Campos is a Brazilian actress. Among her acting roles on Brazilian television are the soap operas Quem Casa com Maria? (1964), O Direito de Nascer (1964) and Viúvas Eróticas (1982).

References

External links

Brazilian television actresses
Brazilian telenovela actresses
20th-century Brazilian actresses
Living people
Year of birth missing (living people)